Aliyu Audu Abubakar  (born 15 June 1996), is a Nigerian footballer who plays as a centre back for Radnik Hadžići.

Career

Club
In December 2014, Abubakar signed a three-year contract with Ashdod, before leaving the club following their relegation at the end of the 2014–15 season. Following his release from Ashdod, Abubakar was linked with a move to an unnamed Serie A side.
In March 2016, Abubakar signed a one-year contract with KuPS, after a successful trial, then a year later, in February 2017, Abubakar signed for Dila Gori.

In April 2018, Aliyu moved to PS Kemi in  Veikkausliiga.

On 5 February 2020, Shakhter Karagandy announced the signing of Abubakar.

Career statistics

Club

Honours
Nigeria U17
FIFA U-17 World Cup: 2013

References

External links
 

Living people
1994 births
Sportspeople from Lagos
Nigerian footballers
Association football defenders
Nigeria youth international footballers
Nigerian expatriate footballers
Expatriate footballers in Israel
Expatriate footballers in Tunisia
Expatriate footballers in Finland
Expatriate footballers in Georgia (country)
Expatriate footballers in Belarus
Expatriate footballers in Ukraine
Expatriate footballers in Kazakhstan
Expatriate footballers in Bosnia and Herzegovina
Nigerian expatriate sportspeople in Israel
Nigerian expatriate sportspeople in Tunisia
Nigerian expatriate sportspeople in Finland
Nigerian expatriate sportspeople in Georgia (country)
Nigerian expatriate sportspeople in Belarus
Nigerian expatriate sportspeople in Ukraine
Nigerian expatriate sportspeople in Kazakhstan
Israeli Premier League players
Ukrainian Premier League players
Erovnuli Liga players
Veikkausliiga players
F.C. Ashdod players
CA Bizertin players
Kuopion Palloseura players
FC Dila Gori players
Kemi City F.C. players
FC Slutsk players
FC Olimpik Donetsk players
FC Shakhter Karagandy players
FC Okzhetpes players
FC Zhetysu players
FK Radnik Hadžići players